Charles David Todd (born April 8, 1972) is an American television journalist who is the 12th and current moderator of NBC's Meet the Press. He also hosts Meet the Press Now, its daily edition on NBC News Now and is the Political Director for NBC News. Before taking the helm of Meet the Press, Todd was Chief White House correspondent for NBC as well as host of The Daily Rundown on MSNBC. He also serves as NBC News' on-air political analyst for NBC Nightly News with Lester Holt and Today.

Early life and education
Todd was born on April 8, 1972, in Miami, Florida, the son of Lois Cheri (née Bernstein) and Stephen Randolph Todd. He is Jewish on his mother's side, and was raised Jewish. He graduated from Miami Killian Senior High School in Kendall, an unincorporated suburban community in greater Miami. Todd attended George Washington University from 1990 to 1994.  He declared a major in political science and a minor in music, but did not earn a degree.

Career

Political campaigns
Before entering the world of political reporting and analysis, Todd earned practical political experience on initiative campaigns in Florida and various national campaigns based in Washington, D.C. While in college, Todd worked for the 1992 presidential campaign of Senator Tom Harkin (D-Iowa) and later started working part-time at National Journal'''s The Hotline.

The Hotline
From 1992 until March 12, 2007, Todd worked for National Journal's The Hotline, where he was editor-in-chief for six years. As part of his position, Todd also co-hosted, with John Mercurio, the webcast series Hotline TV, consisting of a daily show lasting between three and seven minutes and a weekly show ranging between 20 and 30 minutes. He became a frequent guest on political discussion shows, such as Hardball with Chris Matthews and Inside Politics with Judy Woodruff.

NBC News

Tim Russert brought Todd to NBC from The Hotline in March 2007. He became the NBC News political director at that time. In this role, Todd often provided on-air political analysis on political discussion shows, including Morning Joe, Hardball with Chris Matthews, Meet the Press, NBC Nightly News with Lester Holt, and The Rachel Maddow Show and blogged for MSNBC.com at "First Read". He also did a weekly Question and Answer ("Q&A") session with users at Newsvine.

After Tim Russert's death in June 2008, Todd was a candidate to replace him as the host of NBC's Meet the Press, but David Gregory was ultimately selected for the job. On December 18, 2008, NBC announced that Todd would succeed Gregory as NBC News Chief White House Correspondent, partnering with Savannah Guthrie on the news beat. He retained his title as NBC News Political Director and was also named Contributing Editor to Meet the Press. Todd was a focus of an August 2008 Los Angeles Times article paralleling Todd's rise to the rise of cable news networks in coverage of U.S. politics. The article noted the emergence of Todd's fans, deemed "Chuckolytes".

On July 6, 2009, former MSNBC television personality Dan Abrams launched a website service, Mediaite, reporting on media figures. The site ranks all TV-based journalists in America by influence. Todd ranked, as of October 2009, right before Mike Wallace as number five. Todd rose to number two as of December 21, 2011, but fell to 90 as of January 9, 2013. On January 11, 2010, Todd became co-host, with Savannah Guthrie, of The Daily Rundown on MSNBC, airing weekday mornings from 09:00 to 10:00 ET.

On August 14, 2014, NBC announced that Todd would take over as the host of Meet the Press beginning September 7, 2014.  While remaining as NBC News political director, Todd left his role as chief White House correspondent as well as anchor of The Daily Rundown.

On July 23, 2015, MSNBC announced Todd would return to the network with a daily political show called MTP Daily, which was airing weekdays at 17:00 ET. The show was an extension of Meet the Press. Todd continued moderating Meet the Press on NBC.

On January 22, 2017, Todd interviewed Kellyanne Conway on Meet the Press, the day after White House Press Secretary Sean Spicer accused the media of deliberately under-reporting the crowd size at President Trump's inaugural ceremony. In a response to Todd's question about the claims, Conway said: "Our press secretary, Sean Spicer, gave alternative facts to that [i.e., Donald Trump's inaugural crowd size], but the point remains that..." Todd interrupted her, saying: "Wait a minute. Alternative facts? ... Alternative facts are not facts. They're falsehoods."

On June 26 and 27, 2019, Todd, along with Jose Diaz-Balart, Savannah Guthrie, Lester Holt, and Rachel Maddow, moderated the first pair of 2020 Democratic Party presidential debates. Todd's performance as a moderator, in which he ended up speaking more than all but four of the presidential candidates on the first night of the debates, was widely panned. Todd was also criticized for asking candidates lengthy questions and then requesting them to respond "in one or two words".

In a December 2019 interview with Rolling Stone, Todd discussed his belief about how disinformation overtook the media during the Trump administration. However, although Todd had addressed "alternative facts" being lies in January 2017, PressThink—a project of the Arthur L. Carter Journalism Institute at New York University—took Todd to task for failing to address the issues as they unfolded.

On February 11, 2020, Todd came under fire after quoting a conservative columnist on air during his show about 2020 presidential candidate Bernie Sanders that compared Sanders and his supporters to Nazi Brownshirts: "No other candidate has anything like this sort of digital brownshirt brigade. I mean, except for Donald Trump. The question no one is asking is this: What if you can’t win the presidency without an online mob?" The comments were met with instant backlash with #FireChuckTodd trending on Twitter. Sanders, who is Jewish, lost many family members during the Nazi Holocaust. Neither Sanders campaign nor MSNBC commented on the incident.

Other professional ventures
Todd is an adjunct professor at Johns Hopkins University. He is the author of The Stranger: Barack Obama in the White House. Published in 2014, the Chicago Tribune described the book as "richly sourced and deeply informed," while Publishers Weekly called it "an even-handed, concise, and thorough account." Todd is also co-author, with Sheldon Gawiser, of How Barack Obama Won: A State-by-State Guide to the Historic 2008 Presidential Election, published in 2009. Todd picks NFL football games for Tony Kornheiser on his podcast The Tony Kornheiser Show''. Each week, Todd is pitted against Reginald, a monkey, who also picks NFL games.

Personal life
Todd resides in Arlington, Virginia, with his wife, Kristian Denny Todd, and their two children. She is a communications professional and co-founder of Maverick Strategies and Mail, which provides direct mail and consulting services for Democratic candidates and progressive causes. She was the spokesperson for the successful U.S. Senate campaign of Senator Jim Webb in 2006. Although his wife is Christian, they are raising their two children Jewish. 

Todd received an honorary Doctor of Humane Letters degree from Marymount University in recognition of his work in journalism. Todd is a congregant in  the Reform congregation of Temple Rodef Shalom in Falls Church, Virginia.

Todd is an avid Miami Hurricanes football fan.

Published works

References

External links

Chuck Todd bio on MSNBC

1972 births
Living people
American television reporters and correspondents
American political journalists
Jewish American journalists
MSNBC people
NBC News people
21st-century American non-fiction writers
American podcasters
American male journalists
Johns Hopkins University faculty
Columbian College of Arts and Sciences alumni
Writers from Miami
Journalists from Virginia
People from Arlington County, Virginia
Florida Democrats
American Reform Jews
21st-century American male writers